Brivio is a surname. Notable people with the surname include:

 Antonio Brivio (1905–1995), Italian bobsledder and racing driver
 Davide Brivio (born 1988), Italian footballer
 Giuseppe Ferdinando Brivio (c. 169 – c. 1758), Italian composer, conductor, violinist and singing teacher
 Pierluigi Brivio (born 1969), Italian footballer

Italian-language surnames